Billingshurst railway station serves the market town of Billingshurst, in West Sussex, England. It is on the Arun Valley Line  down the line from  via . The station is operated by Southern. The signalbox was believed to be the oldest operational box in the country, and in May 2016 was moved to Amberley Museum and Heritage Centre.

Until 2006 both platforms were only 4 coaches long. Since then the platform for trains towards Pulborough has been extended to take 8 coaches and more recently the London-bound platform has also now been extended to 8-car length.

History

The station was built by the Mid-Sussex Railway and opened along with the line from Horsham to Petworth on 10 October 1859. From the outset, the line was worked by the London Brighton and South Coast Railway, which bought it out in 1862.

Services 
All services at Billingshurst are operated by Southern using  EMUs.

The typical off-peak service in trains per hour is:
 2 tph to  via 
 2 tph to 

Gallery

References

External links 

Railway stations in West Sussex
DfT Category E stations
Former London, Brighton and South Coast Railway stations
Railway stations in Great Britain opened in 1859
Railway stations served by Govia Thameslink Railway
1859 establishments in England